Jeff Greenstein is an American television writer, producer and director. Greenstein was the showrunner of Will & Grace and Dream On, as well as on Partners and Getting Personal, both of which he created. A member of the Writers Guild and Directors Guild of America, Greenstein also created the television series State of Georgia.

Early life and education
Greenstein grew up in Atlanta, Georgia, and graduated from Tufts University with a major in film and dance.

Career
Greenstein was one of the writers on The Charmings. After that, he worked on Dream On for five seasons, before becoming a writer on the show Friends. He was the co-creator and co-showrunner of Partners, and also created, produced, wrote for, and was the showrunner on Getting Personal.

Greenstein was the head writer and showrunner for Will & Grace, and also wrote, executive produced and directed for Desperate Housewives. His directing credits include Husbands and Mom.

Filmography

Television
 The Charmings (writer)
 Mr. Belvedere (writer - 1 episode, 1988)
 Charles in Charge (writer - 1 episode, 1989)
 Dream On
 Incredi-Girl (creator/co-executive producer - TV movie, 1993)
 Friends (writer - 4 episodes, 1994–1995) (supervising producer - 23 episodes, 1994–1995) 
 Partners (co-showrunner/co-creator, 19951996)
 Getting Personal (writer/executive producer, 1998)
 Will & Grace (head writer, showrunner)
 Jake in Progress (writer - 1 episode, 2005) (executive producer - 1 episode, 2006)
 Desperate Housewives (writer/director/producer)
 The Rich Inner Life of Penelope Cloud (writer/executive producer - TV movie, 2007) 
 Parenthood
 State of Georgia (creator/writer/executive producer - 2011)
 Husbands (director/executive producer)
 Way to Go (writer/director - 1 episode, 2013)
 Mom (director - 11 episodes, 2013–2015)
 The Odd Couple (director - 4 episodes, 2016)
 9JKL (director - 2 episodes, 2017)
 Happy Together (director - 2 episodes, 2018)
 The Neighborhood (director - 3 episodes, 2018–2019)
 "RVs and Cats" (director - TV special, 2020)

Awards and nominations
Greenstein has been nominated for Emmy Awards, Producers Guild awards, Writers Guild Awards and CableACE awards. He won the 2000 Emmy for Outstanding Comedy Series as a co-executive producer of Will & Grace.

Greenstein received a 2001 Emmy nomination as a writer for the Will & Grace one-hour flashback episode "Lows in the Mid-Eighties".

In 2009, Greenstein received the P.T. Barnum Award for Excellence in Entertainment, an alumni award from Tufts University.

References

External links

Year of birth missing (living people)
Writers from Atlanta
American television writers
Showrunners
American television directors
American television producers
Primetime Emmy Award winners
School of the Museum of Fine Arts at Tufts alumni
Living people